Michelle Giroux (born 1976) is a Canadian stage, television and film actress whose credits include numerous productions at the Stratford Shakespeare Festival over fourteen seasons.

Stage roles
Upon graduating from high school in Toronto, Giroux was accepted as an acting student at The National Theatre School of Canada.  In her third year she was featured among other artists as one of the "ones to watch" in the Montreal Gazette by theatre critic, Pat Donnelly.  Shortly after graduating she joined the Stratford Festival acting Company in 1997.   Later she would be called "one of the best young talents at Stratford," in Martin Hunter's book about the Festival.

In Romancing the Bard: Stratford at Fifty, Martin Hunter writes:

Her featured roles include the 1998 production of The Miser opposite William Hutt which also played at the New York City Center, Lady Teazle in a 2001 production of The School for Scandal opposite Brian Bedford which went on to play at the Chicago Shakespeare Theater, a 2003 production of Noël Coward's Present Laughter, a 2005 production of The Brothers Karamazov, as well as Julia in a 2007 production of Edward Albee's A Delicate Balance. Other Stratford credits include Nina in The Seagull, Portia in The Merchant of Venice, Elvira in Blithe Spirit, Jean-Louise in To Kill a Mockingbird, Isabella in Edward II, Mary Robinson in The Swanne III, Helena in Midsummer Night's Dream, Rosaline in Love's Labours Lost, Joan La Pucelle in Henry VI, Lydia in Pride and Prejudice and Althia McLaren in Front Page.

Her non-Stratford stage credits include starring in Claudia Dey's Trout Stanley at the Factory Theatre, Karoline Leach's Tryst and Same Time Next Year opposite R.H Thomson at the Segal Centre for Performing Arts in Montreal, an adaptation of The Misanthrope and The Oxford Room Climbers' Rebellion at the Tarragon Theatre and The Winter's Tale, Measure for Measure and Portia (Dora nomination) in Julius Caesar with Groundling Theatre Company.

Screen roles
In 2009, Giroux studied in the inaugural acting class at the Canadian Film Center. Among her teachers were Norman Jewison, Sarah Polley, Kiefer Sutherland and Patricia Rozema. In 2013, Giroux starred in her first feature film, Blood Pressure, directed by Sean Garrity. She was nominated in 2014 for best actress by the Vancouver Film Critics for her performance.

Filmography

Personal life
A resident of Toronto, she married Stratford colleague Graham Abbey in August 2008.

References

External links

Stratford Theatre Festival biography

Living people
National Theatre School of Canada alumni
Actresses from Toronto
1976 births